Maris Lauri (born 1 January 1966) is an Estonian politician, former Minister of Justice and a member of the Reform Party. She was the Minister of Finance in Taavi Rõivas's first cabinet from November 2014 to April 2015 and later as the Minister of Education and Research in 2016. Before her nomination, Lauri worked as the adviser for the Prime Minister. Previously she has worked as the head economist of Swedbank and for the Bank of Estonia.

Lauri was chosen to the Riigikogu in the 2015 election with 4,019 personal votes. She was elected again to the Riigikogu in 2019.

References

1966 births
21st-century Estonian politicians
21st-century Estonian women politicians
Estonian Reform Party politicians
Female finance ministers
Female justice ministers
Finance ministers of Estonia
Living people
Justice ministers of Estonia
Members of the Riigikogu, 2015–2019
Members of the Riigikogu, 2019–2023
Members of the Riigikogu, 2023–2027
People from Kohtla-Järve
Recipients of the Order of the White Star, 5th Class
Women government ministers of Estonia
Women members of the Riigikogu